Daleks' Invasion Earth 2150 A.D. is a 1966 British science fiction film directed by Gordon Flemyng and written by Milton Subotsky, and the second of two films based on the British science-fiction television series Doctor Who. It stars Peter Cushing in a return to the role of the eccentric inventor and time traveller Dr. Who, Roberta Tovey as Susan, Jill Curzon as Louise and Bernard Cribbins as Tom Campbell. It is the sequel to Dr. Who and the Daleks (1965).

The story is based on the Doctor Who television serial The Dalek Invasion of Earth (1964), produced by the BBC. The film was not intended to form part of the ongoing storylines of the television series. Elements from the programme are used, however, such as various characters, the Daleks and a police box time machine, albeit in re-imagined forms.

Plot
Policeman Tom Campbell comes upon several men burgling a jewellery shop. Running to what appears to be a police box to call for backup, he enters Tardis, a time and space machine operated by its inventor Dr. Who, together with his niece Louise and granddaughter Susan, as they are about to depart for the future. Arriving in London in the year 2150, they find a desolate landscape of ruined buildings. It transpires that the Daleks, who Dr. Who and Susan encountered in Dr. Who and the Daleks, have invaded Earth and ravaged the planet. Some of the survivors have formed a resistance movement, while those captured have either been turned into brainwashed slaves called Robomen, or taken to provide forced labour at a Dalek mining complex in Bedfordshire.

Dr. Who and Tom become separated from Louise and Susan, are captured by a squad of Robomen and imprisoned on a Dalek spaceship. Dr. Who manages to release the cell's lock, unaware that the Daleks use escape attempts to test their captives' suitability for robotisation. Meanwhile, a man called Wyler takes Louise and Susan to a resistance base in a London Underground station, where they meet other rebels including David and the wheelchair-bound Dortmun. Dortmun suggests disguising some rebels as Robomen to get onto the Dalek spaceship and using bombs to attack it from inside.

On the spaceship, Dr. Who and Tom are recaptured and taken to be robotised when the rebels, including David, Wyler and Louise, attack it. During the battle, Dr. Who and Tom free themselves. Dr. Who escapes with David, while Tom and Louise become trapped on the spaceship. After the attack fails, Wyler returns to the base where Dortmun and Susan are waiting and tells them that he saw Dr. Who escape. They decide to go to the outskirts of London and hide there until the rebels can regroup. Susan leaves a written message about their intentions for Dr. Who, then they depart and commandeer a van. Dortmun is killed when they encounter a Dalek patrol, however, and Wyler and Susan are forced to abandon the vehicle just before it is destroyed.

After escaping from the spaceship, Dr. Who and David evade the Daleks and return to the now deserted underground station. Failing to see the message left for them, they assume that Wyler, Dortmun and Susan have gone to Bedfordshire to investigate the mining operation and decide to follow them.

Hiding on the Dalek spaceship, which has taken off bound for the Bedford mine, Tom and Louise are reunited. When the craft lands they exit it through a waste chute. Finding themselves in the mining complex, they are attacked by a Roboman but saved by one of the slave-workers, who hides the couple in a tool shed.

Wyler and Susan shelter in a cottage, occupied by a woman and her mother. Susan convinces Wyler that Dr. Who would avoid the Daleks they have seen in the Watford area, head for the Bedfordshire mine instead, and that they must go there too. The daughter then leaves on an errand, but returns with Daleks who capture Wyler and Susan and take them to their mine control centre.

Near the mine Dr. Who and David are confronted by Brockley, a black marketeer, who agrees to smuggle them into the complex. By chance, he leads them to the tool shed where Tom and Louise are hiding. Reunited, they are joined by a prisoner, Conway. He reveals that the Daleks are about to drop a bomb into their mineshaft to destroy the Earth's core. This will then be replaced with a device enabling the aliens to pilot the planet like a giant spacecraft. Plans of the mine show an old shaft leading to a convergence between the planet's magnetic poles. Realising that an explosion at this point would release enough energy to draw the metallic Daleks into the Earth's core, Dr. Who asks Tom and Conway to attempt to deflect the bomb. Brockley also leaves, declining to get involved, and Dr. Who sends Louise and David to help get the prisoners away from the mine. Brockley then betrays Dr. Who, leading a group of Daleks to him. As Dr. Who is led away the Daleks open fire on Brockley, killing him.

As Tom and Conway work in the mineshaft to alter the bomb's trajectory, they are discovered by a Roboman. During the ensuing fight Conway and the Roboman fall to their deaths. Tom uses timbers boarding up the old shaft entrance to create a deflecting ramp, then rushes back the surface.

Dr. Who is taken to the mine control room and meets Wyler and Susan. He seizes the radio link to the Robomen and orders them to turn against their masters. As the Robomen fight the Daleks, Dr. Who escapes with Wyler and Susan while the slave workers flee from the mine. The Daleks quickly defeat the rebellion and release their bomb into the shaft, but the device is deflected and detonates at the pole convergence. The Daleks are pulled into the Earth's core and destroyed while their spaceship, having just taken off, is brought crashing down onto the mine and explodes.

Later, as the travellers prepare to return to the present in Tardis, Tom asks to be taken back to a few minutes before the burglary occurred. Upon arrival he knocks out the thieves and then drives them away in their getaway car, heading for the police station and an anticipated promotion.

Cast

 Peter Cushing as Dr. Who
 Bernard Cribbins as Tom Campbell
 Ray Brooks as David
 Andrew Keir as Wyler
 Roberta Tovey as Susan
 Jill Curzon as Louise
 Roger Avon as Wells
 Geoffrey Cheshire as Roboman
 Keith Marsh as Conway
 Philip Madoc as Brockley
 Steve Peters as Lead Roboman
 Eddie Powell as Thompson
 Godfrey Quigley as Dortmun
 Peter Reynolds as Man on Bicycle
 Bernard Spear as Man with Carrier bag
 Sheila Steafel as Young Woman
 Eileen Way as Old Woman
 Kenneth Watson as Craddock
 John Wreford as Robber
 Robert Jewell – Lead Dalek Operator
 David Graham and Peter Hawkins – Dalek Voices (uncredited)

A number of the film's cast have also had roles in the Doctor Who television series. Bernard Cribbins appeared as recurring character Wilfred Mott between 2007 and 2010, during which it is revealed that he is the grandfather of companion Donna Noble. Philip Madoc appeared four times in the series and in a number of Big Finish Productions Doctor Who audio adventures in different roles. Eileen Way appeared as Old Mother in the Doctor Who TV serial An Unearthly Child and as Karela in The Creature from the Pit. Roger Avon appeared as Saphadin in The Crusade and as Daxtar in The Daleks' Master Plan. Robert Jewell was a Dalek and creature operator, and David Graham and Peter Hawkins provided Dalek and other voices, in the series.

Production
Amicus bought an option to make three Dalek-related stories from Terry Nation and the BBC for £500. Production of the third film, to be based on the serial The Chase, was scrapped because of this film's under-performance at the box-office. Principal photography commenced at Shepperton Studios, England, on 31 January 1966, and was completed on 22 March, eleven days behind schedule. The film's budget of £286,000 was nearly sixty percent larger than its predecessor.

Production was complicated by the illness of Cushing, which required some rewriting of the script to reduce his on-screen appearances. There were also a number of accidents on set. A Dalek prop caught fire during the filming of rebels storming the Dalek spaceship. Stuntman Eddie Powell broke his ankle during a scene in which his character is killed by the Daleks while trying to escape from them. Actor Andrew Keir hurt his wrist when punching through a van windscreen during a sequence in which his character, Wyler, and Susan escape from London.

The design and colour scheme for the majority of the Dalek props was very similar to that used for the television versions at the time, having large, black bases and predominantly silver paintwork, with grey shoulders, natural aluminium collars and slats and blue hemispheres. Three Dalek leaders are also shown, painted respectively in gold, black and red. As with the first Dalek film, the props were fitted with larger dome light than their TV counterparts, and some were equipped with a mechanical claw in place of the standard plunger. The film marks the first instance of the Daleks using rels as a time measurement, this would be used in comics and later in the revived series.

In January 1984, an article about the two Dalek films appeared in Doctor Who Monthly containing production information, photographs and interviews. Another article about the films appeared in the 1995 Spring Special edition of Doctor Who Magazine.

In 1995, a documentary about the two Dalek films, Dalekmania, was released on video. It revealed details about the productions, spin-offs, and publicity campaigns. It was later included as an extra in many of the home media video releases of the two Dalek films.

Release
The film premiered in London on 22 July 1966.

Marketing
Of the film's £286,000 budget, over £50,000 was spent on promotion.

The breakfast cereal Sugar Puffs sponsored the film and, in an example of product placement, Sugar Puffs signs and products can be seen at various points in the film. In exchange for its funding, the company was also allowed to run a competition on its cereal packets to win a Dalek film prop, and feature the Daleks in its television advertisements.

From 1965 to 1967, the TV Century 21 comic featured a one-page Dalek comic strip. From January 1966 onward artists Eric Eden and Ron Turner depicted the Daleks using elements from the film design, including mechanical claws and large bases and dome lights. During the run of the strip, the comic also often featured photographs from, and articles about, the films.

Critical response
The film was given a negative review in The Times newspaper on 21 July 1966: "The second cinematic excursion of the Daleks shows little advance on the first... The filming of all this is technically elementary... and the cast, headed by the long-suffering, much ill-used Peter Cushing, seem able, unsurprisingly, to drum up no conviction whatever in anything they are called to do. Grown-ups may enjoy it, but most children have more sense."

Alan Jones of the Radio Times gave the film three stars out of five in a retrospective review, stating "Independence Day it's not, but director Gordon Flemyng keeps the colourful action moving swiftly along to cheap and cheerful effect. Youngsters will love it, while adults will want to E-X-T-E-R-M-I-N-A-T-E Bernard Cribbins, who provides comic relief as the bumbling bobby. Yet, through all the mindless mayhem roll the ever-impressive Daleks, truly one of science fiction's greatest alien creations."

In a review of the 2013 Blu-ray release, Starburst reviewer Paul Mount said the feature was "a leaner, slicker film than its predecessor, its bigger scale and lavish location filming giving the story room to breathe and allowing for some effective action sequences, such as the rebel attack on the impressive Dalek flying saucer."

Radio adaptation
The film's soundtrack was adapted and presented by Gordon Gow for radio broadcast on the BBC Light Programme on 18 November 1966 as Show 305 of the Movietime series. It was produced by Tony Luke.

Home media

Super 8 film
 Released in the UK by Walton Sound and Film Services in 1977.

VHS
 Released in the UK by Thorn EMI in 1982 and by Warner Home Video in 1988 and 1996.
 Released in the US by Thorn EMI in 1985 and by Lumiere in 1994.
 Released in Australia by Warner Home Video in 1990.
 Released in Japan by King Video/Tohokushinsha Film Co. in 1992.

Betamax
 Released in the UK by Thorn EMI in 1982.

DVD
 Both films, plus the Dalekmania documentary, released in the US by Anchor Bay Entertainment as a boxset in 2001 and by Lionsgate as a two-disc set in 2012.
 Both films, plus the Dalekmania documentary, released in Australia by StudioCanal as a two-disc boxset in 2001.
 The film, plus the Dalekmania documentary, released in France (as Les Daleks Envahissent La Terre, with original French soundtrack) by Canal+video in 2001.
 Both films, plus the Dalekmania documentary, released in the UK by StudioCanal as a two-disc boxset in 2002 and 2006.
 Released in Spain (as Los Daleks Invaden la Tierra 2150 AD, with original Spanish soundtrack) by Universal Pictures Iberia S.L.. in 2009
 Released in Australia by Umbrella Entertainment in 2012 together with the Dalekmania documentary.

Blu-ray
 The film, plus the Dalekmania documentary, released in the UK by StudioCanal in 2013.
 Both films, released in the UK by StudioCanal/Optimum Releasing as a two-disc box set in 2013.
 Released in the UK by StudioCanal as a Zavvi exclusive 'SteelBook' limited edition in 2015.
 Released in Australia by Umbrella Entertainment in 2014 together with the Dalekmania documentary.
The film, plus the Dalekmania documentary, released in the US by Kino Lorber in 2020.
 A restored and remastered version released on 4K UHD disc by StudioCanal, in both Limited Edition and standard Steelbook formats in 2022.

Soundtrack
 Music from both films was released by Silva Screen Records on a CD entitled Dr. Who & the Daleks in 2009 and on a limited edition double vinyl LP in 2016.
 Selected tracks from both films were released by Silva Screen Records as a limited edition 7-inch EP in 2011.
 Music from the film was released on an LP by StudioCanal in 2022 as part of a package also including 4K UHD and Blu-ray discs of the film.

Cancelled third film
There were plans for a third film based on the serial The Chase but these were abandoned following the film's poor box office reception.

Roberta Tovey reprised her role as Susan for a minisode in the documentary More than... 30 Years in the TARDIS. Set in the Dalek-infested London of the 22nd century, the skit shows a Black and Red Dalek and two Robomen moving past Tardis without noticing it. After they leave, the doors open to reveal Susan, grinning at her successful stealth.

In an interview following the skit, Tovey harboured hopes of a follow-up to the two Cushing films centering on an adult version of her Susan, having taken on her grandfather's mantle as an adventurer in time and space; these plans never materialised.

References

Further reading
 John Walsh (2022) Dr Who & The Daleks: The Official Story of the Films, Titan Books

External links

 
 
 
 Daleks' Invasion Earth 2150 A.D. at Tardis Data Core
 

1966 films
1960s science fiction films
1960s English-language films
British science fiction films
British sequel films
Alien invasions in films
Amicus Productions films
Dalek stories
Films based on Doctor Who
Films directed by Gordon Flemyng
Films set in the 22nd century
Films set in London
1960s British films